The Calder Houses in Cedar Rapids, Iowa, United States are historic houses that were built in 1868. The two identical houses were built by Charles Calder who moved to Cedar Rapids from the state of New York in 1851.  He was involved in real estate and land speculation and at the time of his death in 1890 he held a significant amount of real estate in the city.  The houses are two-story front gable cottages.  The brick structures are built on stone foundations.  They are among the oldest houses in Cedar Rapids.  The houses were listed on the National Register of Historic Places in 1978.

See also
List of the oldest buildings in Iowa

References

Houses completed in 1868
Houses in Cedar Rapids, Iowa
National Register of Historic Places in Cedar Rapids, Iowa
Houses on the National Register of Historic Places in Iowa